Sandrart may refer to:

People

Esther Barbara von Sandrart (1651—1733), German art collector
Jacob von Sandrart (1630—1708), a German engraver.
Joachim von Sandrart (1606–1688), a German Baroque art-historian and painter.
Johann von Sandrart (1610–1679), painter and etcher in Frankfort, Rome und Amsterdam.
Karl Gustav von Sandrart (1817-1898), Prussian general in the Franco-Prussian War of 1870.
Susanne Maria von Sandrart (1658–1716), a German artist and engraver.